Jaime David Gómez Munguía (29 December 1929 – 4 May 2008) was a Mexican professional footballer who played as a goalkeeper for the Mexico national team in FIFA World Cup tournaments (1958) and (1962).

Career
Born in Manzanillo, Colima, Gómez played football for C.D. Guadalajara, winning six titles Primera División with the club. He made his debut with Chivas on 5 May 1950.

Gómez was admitted into the International Soccer Hall of Fame in 2012.

Personal
Gómez died from pancreatic cancer at age 78.

References

External links

1929 births
2008 deaths
Sportspeople from Manzanillo, Colima
Footballers from Colima
Mexican footballers
Mexico international footballers
Association football goalkeepers
C.D. Guadalajara footballers
1958 FIFA World Cup players
1962 FIFA World Cup players
Liga MX players
Deaths from cancer in Mexico
Deaths from pancreatic cancer